Robbie Coburn (born 25 June 1994) is a contemporary Australian poet and writer.

Life and work

Coburn was born in Melbourne and grew up on his family's farm in Woodstock, Victoria. His father was a horse trainer and later a greyhound trainer, which is a large focus of his poetry.
He was educated at Whittlesea Primary School and Assumption College, Kilmore and briefly studied at La Trobe University before dropping out of his degree. As a teenager, he began experiencing depression, and has struggled with addictions to alcohol and various drugs, as well as with self-harm, topics frequently explored in his work.
He began writing poetry at the age of 14, influenced by the works of Edgar Allan Poe.

Coburn's first published poem appeared in anarchist poet Pi O's literary journal Unusual Work when he was 17 years old and he has since been published in many journals and magazines, including Poetry, Meanjin, Island and Westerly. Some of his poems have also been included in major anthologies.

His first full-length collection of poems Rain Season was published in 2013 when he was 18 years old.
A second collection The Other Flesh was published by UWA Publishing in 2019.

Robert Adamson has noted that Coburn’s poems “come from tough experiences, yet are created with a muscular craft that glows with alert intelligence”.

In 2021, Coburn published "Home for the Rodeo", an essay detailing his struggles with alcoholism and his love of the sport of rodeo.

Works

Bibliography

Poetry 

Rain Season (2013)
The Other Flesh (2019)
Ghost Poetry

Anthologies 

Writing to the Wire. Dan Disney (ed.), Kit Kelen (ed.) (UWA Publishing, 2016)
To End All Wars. Dael Allison (ed.), Anna Couani (ed.), Kit Kelen (ed.), Les Wicks (ed.) (Puncher & Wattmann, 2018)

Short Fiction Collections 

 Theatre of Nightmares (2010)

Discography

Solo 

Horse Songs

with TVISB 

Womb (2023)

See also
List of Australian poets

References

External links
Poetry Foundation profile
 Official website
 Poem in Meanjin
 Profile in Overland by Peter Minter
 2 poems in Mascara Literary Review
 Robbie Coburn's 'Suicide Country'
 3 poems in foam:e

Living people
Australian poets
1994 births
People with mood disorders
Writers from Melbourne
People from the City of Whittlesea